Vincent Lamont Baker (born November 23, 1971) is an American former professional basketball player who played in the National Basketball Association (NBA). He appeared in four consecutive All-Star Games. As of 2018, Baker serves as an assistant coach for the Milwaukee Bucks.

High school and college basketball career

High school 
Baker played for Old Saybrook High School in Old Saybrook, Connecticut. He first started on Old Saybrook's varsity in his junior year. Baker was passed over by the bigger Division I schools and signed a scholarship offer from the Hartford Hawks.

College 
During Baker's inaugural season in 1989, he averaged 4.7 points and 2.9 rebounds per game, which earned him a place on the North Atlantic Conference (now America East Conference) All-Rookie Team. Named a starter for his sophomore season, Baker averaged 19.7 PPG and 10.4 RPG and a first team All-NAC spot. As a Junior, Baker averaged 27.6 PPG (2nd in the country), 9.9 RPG, and 3.7 blocks per game (5th in the country), though the team finished with an abysmal 6–21 record. Entering his final season, Baker was called "America's Best-Kept Secret" by Sports Illustrated  and the conference's most dominant player since Reggie Lewis by Street & Smith's College/Prep Basketball Preview in 1992. Baker averaged 28.3 PPG (4th in the country) and finished with 792 points in only 28 games, a conference record that still remains in the NAC. He finished with 2,238 points, a school record that still stands. However, Baker was not able to translate his immense scoring abilities into team success, as none of his teams ever made the NCAA tournament, and the best his Hartford teams ever finished in a season was .500 (14–14).

Baker's jersey (#42) hangs on the east wall of Chase Arena in the Reich Family Pavilion.

NBA career

Milwaukee Bucks
After a college career at the University of Hartford, Baker was selected by the Milwaukee Bucks with the 8th pick of the 1993 NBA draft. He played four seasons in Milwaukee, during which he was the leading star (alongside Glenn Robinson) and received three all-star selections.

On March 14, 1995, Baker recorded a triple double, with 12 points, 12 rebounds, and 12 assists, in a win against the Charlotte Hornets. On April 11, 1995, Baker scored 31 points, grabbed 12 rebounds, and recorded 9 assists in a 114–100 victory over the Detroit Pistons. 

During the 1995–96 and 1996–97 seasons, Baker averaged at least 21.0 points.

On March 1, 1997, Baker recorded a career-high 6 blocks, alongside 20 points and 15 rebounds, in a 103–92 loss against the Sacramento Kings.

Despite his personal success as a player while in Milwaukee, the Bucks were not able to make the postseason during his tenure with the team.

Seattle SuperSonics 
After four seasons with the Bucks, he was traded to the Seattle SuperSonics following the 1996–97 NBA season in a three-team deal that sent Tyrone Hill and Terrell Brandon to the Bucks, and Shawn Kemp and Sherman Douglas to the Cleveland Cavaliers.

Baker helped the SuperSonics to a strong 1997-98 NBA season and a first round win over the Minnesota Timberwolves, while proving to be a valuable replacement for Kemp. On May 12, 1998, in a decisive Game 5 of a hard-fought Western Conference Semifinals against the Los Angeles Lakers (both teams finished the season with a 61–21 record, though Seattle had home-court advantage due to a tiebreaker), Baker led Seattle with 29 points and 9 rebounds in a losing effort.

On February 1, 2000, Baker scored 33 points, recorded 5 assists, and 5 rebounds, in a 104–96 victory against Karl Malone and the Jazz.

Boston Celtics 
After four years in Seattle, Baker was traded to the Boston Celtics with Shammond Williams for Kenny Anderson, Vitaly Potapenko and Joseph Forte. While his career averages include 15.1 points per game, his numbers had dropped considerably in the twenty-first century. After the 1998–99 NBA lockout season in Seattle, Baker's weight ballooned to near 300 pounds and his game suffered tremendously. While Baker was able to get his weight down to around 250, Baker revealed that he was a recovering alcoholic who used to binge in hotel rooms and at home after playing poorly. In an interview with the Boston Globe, Baker said Celtics coach Jim O'Brien smelled alcohol on him in practice and confronted him about it. The team suspended him and he was eventually released.

New York Knicks 
Baker would sign with the New York Knicks. The team reached the playoffs in the 2003–04 NBA season.

Houston Rockets 
Baker was traded to the Rockets with Moochie Norris for Maurice Taylor on February 24, 2005.

Los Angeles Clippers 
The Rockets would ultimately release Baker on October 7, 2005. He would spend the 2005–06 NBA season in a reserve role with the Los Angeles Clippers.

Minnesota Timberwolves
Baker signed with the Minnesota Timberwolves on October 1, 2006, reuniting him with head coach Dwane Casey, who served as an assistant coach when Baker was in Seattle. His tenure in Minnesota would be short-lived, though. Baker was released from the Timberwolves on November 13, 2006. He never played in a regular season game after being on the inactive list for the first six games.

NBA career statistics

Regular season

|-
| style="text-align:left;"| 
| style="text-align:left;"| Milwaukee
| 82 || 63 || 31.2 || .501 || .200 || .569 || 7.6 || 2.0 || .7 || 1.4 || 13.5
|-
| style="text-align:left;"| 
| style="text-align:left;"| Milwaukee
| 82 || 82 || style="background:#cfecec;"| 41.0* || .483 ||  .292  || .593 || 10.3 || 3.6 || 1.0 || 1.4 || 17.7 
|-
| style="text-align:left;"| 
| style="text-align:left;"| Milwaukee
| 82 || 82 || 40.5 || .489 || .208 || .670 || 9.9 || 2.6 || .8 || 1.1 || 21.1  
|-
| style="text-align:left;"| 
| style="text-align:left;"| Milwaukee 
| 78 || 78 || 40.5 || .505 || .278 || .687 || 10.3 || 2.7 || 1.0 || 1.4 || 21.0       
|-
| style="text-align:left;"| 
| style="text-align:left;"| Seattle
| 82 || 82 || 35.9 || .542 || .143 || .591 || 8.0  || 1.9 || 1.1 || 1.0 || 19.2 
|-
| style="text-align:left;"| 
| style="text-align:left;"| Seattle
| 34 || 31 || 34.2 || .453 || .000  || .450 || 6.2 || 1.6 ||   .9 || 1.0 || 13.8 
|-
| style="text-align:left;"| 
| style="text-align:left;"| Seattle
| 79 || 75 || 36.1 || .455 || .250 || .682 || 7.7 || 1.9 || .6 ||  .8 || 16.6
|-
| style="text-align:left;"| 
| style="text-align:left;"| Seattle
| 76 || 27 || 28.0 || .422 || .063  || .723  ||  5.7 || 1.2  ||  .5  || 1.0  ||  12.2
|-
| style="text-align:left;"| 
| style="text-align:left;"| Seattle  
|  55  || 41  || 31.1  || .485  || .125  || .633  || 6.4  || 1.3  || .4  ||  .7 ||  14.1 
|-
| style="text-align:left;"| 
| style="text-align:left;"| Boston
| 52   || 9  ||  18.1 || .478  ||  .000 || .673  || 3.8  || .6  || .4  || .6 || 5.2  
|-
| style="text-align:left;"| 
| style="text-align:left;"| Boston
|  37  || 33  || 27.0  || .505  ||  .000 ||  .732 || 5.7  || 1.5 || .6  || .6  ||  11.3  
|-
| style="text-align:left;"| 
| style="text-align:left;"| New York
|  17  ||  0 ||  18.4 || .404  || .500  || .711  || 4.1  ||   .7 ||  .4 ||  .5 ||  6.6
|-
| style="text-align:left;"| 
| style="text-align:left;"| New York
|  24    || 0  ||  8.0 || .342  || .000  || .467   ||  1.5 || .4  ||  .1  ||  .2 ||  1.4
|-
| style="text-align:left;"| 
| style="text-align:left;"| Houston 
|  3   ||  0 || 4.3  || .000  || .000  || 1.000  ||  .7  ||  .3  ||  .0 || .0  || .7
|-
| style="text-align:left;"| 
| style="text-align:left;"| L.A. Clippers
|  8  ||  1 || 10.6 || .467  ||  .000 || .722 ||  2.4 || .5  || .5 || .5  || 3.4
|- class="sortbottom"
| style="text-align:center;" colspan=2| Career
|  791   || 604  ||  32.5 ||  .485 || .215  || .638  || 7.4  || 1.9  || .7  || 1.0  || 15.0
|- class="sortbottom"
| style="text-align:center;" colspan=2| All-Star
|   4  || 0  || 17.5  || .419  || .000  || .750  || 6.0  || .7  || .5  || .2  || 8.7

Playoffs

|-
| style="text-align:left;"| 1998
| style="text-align:left;"| Seattle
| 10   || 10  || 37.1  || .530  || .000 || .421  || 9.4   ||  1.8 ||   1.8  || 1.5  || 15.8
|-
| style="text-align:left;"| 2000
| style="text-align:left;"| Seattle
|  5  ||  4 || 35.4  ||  .400 || .000  || .588	  || 7.6  ||   2.0 || 1.0  ||  .4 || 14.0
|-
| style="text-align:left;"| 2002
| style="text-align:left;"| Seattle
|  5  || 4  || 28.8 || .500  || 1.000  ||  .778 ||  5.0 || .8  || .6  || 1.2  || 13.2
|-
| style="text-align:left;"| 2004
| style="text-align:left;"| New York
|  4 || 0 || 14.3 || .571  || .000  ||  .667 || 3.0  || .3  || .8  || .5  || 5.5  
|- class="sortbottom"
| style="text-align:center;" colspan=2| Career
| 24  || 18  || 31.2  || .491  || .500	  || .534  || 7.0  ||  1.4 ||  1.2 || 1.0  || 13.2

Other endeavors
Baker has a non-profit foundation called the Stand Tall Foundation. The Stand Tall Foundation is an organization that helps give kids a better future by financially assisting with different charitable and volunteer organizations. The goal of the Stand Tall Foundation is to help young people with their education, personal development and general well-being.

On June 3, 2011, Baker was hired as an assistant high school boys basketball coach at St. Bernard School in Uncasville, Connecticut.

In 2014, Baker was named to a team assembled by Dennis Rodman as part of his "basketball diplomacy" effort in North Korea; the team was assembled to play an exhibition game against the North Korean Senior National Team to celebrate the birthday of Kim Jong-un.

As of December 2015, Baker was managing a Starbucks location in Old Saybrook, Connecticut. Baker later became Fox Sports Milwaukee's home team broadcaster.

In 2017, Baker became the head of the basketball department at Camp Greylock.

As of 2019, Baker serves as an assistant coach for the Milwaukee Bucks. He won a championship with the Bucks in that role during 2021.

On July 18, 2020, The Vin Baker Foundation hosted a 5k run called "Addiction Ends Here".

Personal life
Baker's mother is Jean Baker. His father, Rev. James Baker, is an auto mechanic and Baptist minister. Baker has a wife and four children.

On June 19, 2007, Baker was arrested in Norwich, Connecticut for drunk driving after leaving Foxwoods Resort Casino.

On June 21, 2008 ml-implode.com reported that Baker's  Durham, Connecticut home was foreclosed and put up for sale for $2.3 million. The house was purchased by U.S. Bank for $2.5 million at an auction on June 28, 2008. Baker reportedly lost over $100 million due to financial troubles.

Baker has struggled with depression and alcoholism. Baker cites these issues as the main reason his career seemingly derailed out of nowhere. In 2013, the New York Daily News reported that he had stopped drinking alcohol on April 17, 2011.

See also
 List of National Basketball Association annual minutes leaders

References

External links

 The Curious Case of Vin Baker

1971 births
Living people
American men's basketball players
Basketball coaches from Connecticut
Basketball coaches from Florida
Basketball players at the 2000 Summer Olympics
Basketball players from Connecticut
Basketball players from Florida
Boston Celtics players
Centers (basketball)
Hartford Hawks men's basketball players
High school basketball coaches in Connecticut
Houston Rockets players
Los Angeles Clippers players
Medalists at the 2000 Summer Olympics
Milwaukee Bucks assistant coaches
Milwaukee Bucks draft picks
Milwaukee Bucks players
National Basketball Association All-Stars
New York Knicks players
Olympic gold medalists for the United States in basketball
People from Lake Wales, Florida
People from Old Saybrook, Connecticut
Power forwards (basketball)
Seattle SuperSonics players
Sportspeople from Polk County, Florida
United States men's national basketball team players